The State Committee for construction and architecture is a Cabinet department in the Executive branch of the Republic of Bashkortostan government. It is the successor of the former Ministry of Construction, architecture and transport, which was split in State Committee for construction and architecture and State Committee for Transport and Roads in 2010 under President Rustem Khamitov.

Mission
The State Committee for construction and architecture's mission is to create strong, sustainable, inclusive communities and quality affordable homes for all.

The State Committee for construction and architecture is working to strengthen the housing market to bolster the economy and protect consumers; meet the need for quality affordable rental homes; utilize housing as a platform for improving quality of life; build inclusive and sustainable communities free from discrimination; and transform the way The State Committee for construction and architecture and architecture does business.

See also
United States Department of Housing and Urban Development

Notes and references

External links
 Republic of Bashkortostan State Committee of construction and architecture Official Website in Russian

Politics of Bashkortostan